Chia-Jen Lo (born 7 April 1986), is a Taiwanese professional baseball pitcher who is currently a free agent. He has played for the Fubon Guardians of the CPBL and the Houston Astros of Major League Baseball (MLB).

Career

Houston Astros
On October 31, 2008, Lo signed with the Houston Astros. Lo made his professional debut with the High-A Lancaster JetHawks, and also spent time with the Double-A Corpus Christi Hooks, logging a 2.10 ERA in 42 appearances between the two teams. Lo was invited to Spring Training with the Astros in 2010, but did not make the team and was assigned to Corpus Christi, where he spent the season, posting a 1.80 ERA in 7 appearances. In 2011, Lo played for the Single-A Lexington Legends, but only appeared in 2 games and struggled to a 13.50 ERA. The following season, Lo split the year between Lancaster and the rookie-level GCL Astros, pitching to an 0.90 ERA with 31 strikeouts in 30.0 innings across 19 appearances. Lo was added to the Astros' 40-man roster after the 2012 season.

On July 29, 2013, Lo was promoted to the major leagues for the first time by the Astros. He made his major league debut on July 31, pitching one scoreless inning of relief and recording his first career strikeout in an 11–0 win over the Baltimore Orioles. Lo made 19 appearances with Houston in 2013, recording an 0-3 record and 4.19 ERA. In 17 minor league games with Corpus Christi, the Single-A Quad Cities River Bandits, and the Low-A Tri-City ValleyCats, Lo accumulated a 3.24 ERA.

On April 5, 2014, Lo was outrighted off of the Astros' 40-man roster. He was assigned to the Triple-A Oklahoma City RedHawks, and recorded a 4.74 ERA in 16 games before he was released by Houston on May 27.

EDA Rhinos/Fubon Guardians
Following his release from Houston, Lo signed with the EDA Rhinos of the Chinese Professional Baseball League (CPBL). He spent the year as the teams closer, pitching 15.2 scoreless innings in 12 games with the team. In 2015, Lo played in 49 games with the Rhinos, logging a 2-5 record and 5.19 ERA with 39 strikeouts in 43.1 innings of work. Lo did not appear in a game for the Rhinos in 2016 after undergoing shoulder surgery. In November 2016, the Rhinos rebranded as the Fubon Guardians after Fubon Financial Holding Co. bought the team. In 2017 with, Fubon, Lo recorded a 7.20 ERA in 7 appearances. The following season, Lo made 23 appearances for the Guardians, but struggled to an 8.35 ERA.

After the 2018 season, Lo signed with the Sydney Blue Sox of the Australian Baseball League for the 2018/19 season. Lo posted a 5.00 ERA in 7 games. In 2019, Lo played in only 3 games for Fubon's main team, but struggled to a 16.20 ERA. Lo was released by Guardians because of his poor control after 2019 season.

Wei Chuan Dragons
On December 31, 2019, Lo signed a contract with the Wei Chuan Dragons of the Chinese Professional Baseball League (CPBL). He spent the entire 2020 season with Wei Chuan's minor league team, without appearing in a game with the main club. On July 18, 2021, it was announced that Lo would undergo Tommy John surgery, ending his season without having appeared in a game for the Dragons. He was released following the season on December 21, 2021.

International career
Lo selected Chinese Taipei national baseball team at the 2008 Summer Olympics, 2009 World Baseball Classic, 2013 exhibition games against Japan, 2014 Asian Games and 2015 WBSC Premier12.

See also
 List of Major League Baseball players from Taiwan

References

External links

1986 births
Living people
Asian Games silver medalists for Chinese Taipei
Asian Games medalists in baseball
Baseball players at the 2008 Summer Olympics
Baseball players at the 2014 Asian Games
Corpus Christi Hooks players
EDA Rhinos players
Fubon Guardians players
Gulf Coast Astros players
Houston Astros players
Lancaster JetHawks players
Lexington Legends players
Major League Baseball pitchers
Major League Baseball players from Taiwan
Medalists at the 2014 Asian Games
Olympic baseball players of Taiwan
People from Pingtung County
Quad Cities River Bandits players
Sydney Blue Sox players
Taiwanese expatriate baseball players in the United States
Tri-City ValleyCats players
2009 World Baseball Classic players
2015 WBSC Premier12 players
Taiwanese expatriate baseball players in Australia